Phineas and Ferb is the first soundtrack album for the Disney Channel television series, Phineas and Ferb, which was released September 22, 2009 in the United States by Disney Channel Records, Walt Disney Records and Hollywood Records. The album contains 26 songs from season one. It also contains the bonus track "The F-Games" that can only be heard online.

As of March 6, 2010, the soundtrack had sold about 122,600 copies in the United States.

Background
The artists on the soundtrack all are in Phineas and Ferb except for Bowling for Soup who performs the theme tune for the series. The song "Gitchee Gitchee Goo" performed by Vincent Martella, Hayden Panettiere and Ashley Tisdale featured in the episode "Flop Starz", was also included in the 2009 album Disney Channel Playlist.

Release
The original report cited that the initial February 10, 2009 release date had been pushed back to August 4. On June 26, 2009 the release date was pushed back to September 22, 2009. Later this has been confirmed on the official website. The soundtrack was released in the United Kingdom on October 10, 2009 via EMI Music.

Track listing

Charts

Release dates

Other releases
Several other soundtracks for the series have been released. 
Phineas and Ferb's Christmas Vacation: A soundtrack for the Christmas special, only released digitally in December 2009.
Disney Karaoke Series: Phineas and Ferb: A karaoke CD re-release of the series' soundtrack, released on March 30, 2010.
Phineas and Ferb: Summer Belongs To You!: A soundtrack for the one-hour special, released on August 3, 2010. It was released on a CD on May 21, 2012.
Phineas and Ferb Holiday Favorites: Contains 7 songs from Phineas and Ferb's Christmas Vacation, 8 Christmas carols sung by Phineas and Ferb characters, and a song that was cut from the special for time ("What Does He Want?"), released on September 21, 2010.
Phineas and Ferb: Across the 1st and 2nd Dimensions: Contains songs from Phineas and Ferb the Movie: Across the 2nd Dimension, and various episodes from Season 2 of the show, such as Rollercoaster: The Musical!, released on August 2, 2011.
Phineas and Ferb-ulous: The Ultimate Album: A CD/DVD combo pack that was released in the UK, August 16, 2011. Also contains the songs from Summer Belongs to You!.
Phineas and Ferb the Movie: Across the 2nd Dimension Song Sampler: A digital soundtrack on the digital copy disc of Phineas and Ferb the Movie: Across the 2nd Dimension, included with the DVD release of the movie. It contains all songs from the movie, with the exception of "Kick It Up a Notch."
Phineas and Ferb: Rockin' and Rollin': A digital album featuring songs mostly from seasons 3 and 4 with some songs from the first two seasons that were not released before.
Phineas and Ferb: Star Wars: Contains 5 songs from the special of the same name.
Phineas and Ferb: Last Day of Summer: Features all songs from the last episode and some songs from the special Night of the Living Pharmacists.  This album also features the theme song from the O.W.C.A. Files special.
Phineas and Ferb the Movie: Candace Against the Universe: Contains songs from the movie of the same name, a song that was cut for time ("Step into the Great Unknown"), and four score cues, released on August 28, 2020.

References

External links
Phineas & Ferb at Walt Disney Records
[ Phineas and Ferb Original TV Soundtrack] at Allmusic
Lyrics for phineas and ferb theme song

Soundtrack
2009 soundtrack albums
Dance-pop soundtracks
Teen pop albums
Pop rock soundtracks
Walt Disney Records soundtracks
Hollywood Records soundtracks
Television animation soundtracks